Revisionism is a term which emerged in the late 1990s and is applied to a group of pro-Francoist historiographic theories related to the recent history of Spain.

History

Until the late 1990s in Spain the term revisionismo histórico was applied to various historiographic debates abroad, often though not always related to Nazism. It was seldom used against the local background and its denotation could have varied, e.g. in 1988 the expression was employed to stand for scientific historiography. According to scholars who later confronted revisionism, this general setting changed in the mid-1990s; the new government of José María Aznar launched a bid to revise the dominant historiographic view of the recent past. In administrative terms the scheme was embodied e.g. in Plan de Mejora de la Enseñanza, a scheme aimed at re-design of the school curriculum, in 1997 proposed to the Cortes and eventually rejected. In parallel the Right-wing administration mounted a public-discourse counter-offensive, which climaxed in "Operación Moa". Its supposed result was commercial success of 3 books which appeared on the market between 1999 and 2003; written by an amateur historian and far-right propagandist Pio Moa, they focused on the Second Republic and the Civil War.

Moa's books triggered adverse response. It was first embodied in a 1999 manifesto titled Combate por la historia; signed by historians, writers and public figures, it was the first to apply the term "revisionistas" to a group of unnamed Spanish historians, charged with distortions and falsifications. In the early 21st century the name filtered into newspapers and the phenomenon became a widely discussed topic, especially that also other books charged with revisionism were selling very well. According to some scholars, the second term of the Aznar government reinforced the revisionist efforts, expressed e.g. as another education plan advanced by Real Academia de Historia. The anti-revisionist backlash climaxed in 2005-2006 as 3 books produced by professional historians and edited by Alberto Reig Tapia and Francisco Espinosa Maestre; the volumes supposedly definitely dismantled the revisionist Moa narrative and at the time they were thought to have terminated the debate.

Instead of dying out, after 2005 the debate on revisionism flamed on and was brought to another level. To some extent sustained by adoption of Ley de la Memoria Historica in 2007, the discussion transformed when a group of professional historians challenged the anti-revisionists; from that moment onwards the conflict was no longer between amateurs and scholars, but between the scholars themselves. It reached another milestone in 2010-2011, the years when Manuel Álvarez Tardío and Roberto Villa García published a general work on the Second Republic and when RAH-edited Diccionario Biográfico Español published a biography of Francisco Franco. The latter caused heated controversy mostly in popular discourse; according to many, the biography was revisionist and scandalous. The former had a low-profile but more lasting effect, and became a negative point of reference for many works confronting revisionist historiography. The discussion on revisionism kept escalating and assumed increasingly militant tone. The next milestone was reached when in 2014 Stanley G. Payne published his biography of Franco (co-authored by Jesús Palacios Tapias); at that point some concluded that revisionism was embraced by the world's most distinguished Hispanists. Since then the debate has reached an unprecedented level and spilled over to global historiography. It is also reflected in 2018 debates related to proposal of a new Ley de Memoria Histórica.

Name and beyond

Some scholars who confront the revisionist tide claim that the term "revisionism" as such is not by default deprecatory and some authors considered champions of anti-revisionism declare themselves revisionists, naming skepticism a recommended historiographic approach. They note that authors who strive to re-write history of Spain of the 20th century do not actually deserve the name of "revisionist" and should rather be called manipulators and liars; they are dubbed "self-proclaimed revisionists". Others reserve the term for intellectuals like de Felice, Nolte, Lachmann or Furet and underline that the likes of Moa or Vidal are nowhere near their stature. There are authors who agree that the name has been abused and label their opponents rather as "pseudo-revisionists". Finally, some scholars distinguish between "revisionism", the term reserved for amateurish writings of Moa or others, and "neo-revisionism", the term applied to scientifically grounded works pursuing similar yet not identical views. Finally, few authors note that historiographic revision is generally welcome and needed, but "revisionism" by default stands for revision based on manipulation and has no place in the academic realm.

Most authors who rebuke attempts to distort and falsify history do not go into such detail and refer to "revisionismo histórico" and "revisionistas". The name denotes an attempt to revise a generally accepted, proven scientific version of recent Spanish history and is applied to both "historiadores coyunturales" and "historiadores profesionales"; recently the term is applied not only to professionals in historiographic science but also to scholars who until their "enigmatic evolution" had been global icons of scientific Hispanism. Sometimes in such cases the term is qualified as perfectly respectable scientific "revisionismo amable", yet usually no such distinction is made. At times revisionism is divided into purist and comparative branches. Sometimes two labels associated are "denialism" and "negationism", as the authors in question deny or negate generally accepted and supposedly proven historiographic concepts.

Though authors classified as revisionists are typically charged with nurturing post-Francoist, pro-Francoist, neo-Francoist, quasi-Francoist or plainly Francoist sentiments, some effort is made to distinguish between "Francoist historiography" and "revisionist historiography". The former is deemed actually orthodox in its Francoist set of old-style schemes and traits, immune to discourse, straight continuation of pre-1975 narrative and represented by authors of older generation like Ricardo de la Cierva, Vicente Palacio Atard and Fernando Vizcaíno Casas. The latter is deemed to be a confrontational response to historiographic vision generally agreed after 1975. It is at times pictured as a school represented by a new generation of authors often armed with modern scientific tools, some of these authors skilled if not excelling – this is, until they embraced revisionism - in historiographic craft. It is only recently that in course of increasingly heated debate less and less attention is paid to tell Francoist historians from revisionist historians. Both groups might be bundled together, many threads and motives are supposed to prove continuity of their historiographic vision, and revisionism is painted as "almost 'Blue'". Some critics of revisionism go even further and claim that it is actually an orthodox Francoist reading of history.

Works questioned

There are some 10-15 books which come up repeatedly as negative points of reference of the anti-revisionist discourse, though further volumes might be referred less frequently or even occasionally. They roughly fall into two different categories. One is composed of loose essays, formatted for non-specialized reader and deprived of back matter, which usually forms part of scientific apparatus; this is the case of volumes published by Moa, Vidal, Martín Rubio or others. Another one is composed of fully fledged historiographic studies aimed for more experienced if not professional audience; this is the case of books published by Álvarez Tardío, Villa García, del Rey Reguillo or others. Works from both categories most frequently charged with revisionism are listed below, precedence given to volumes which stand most prominently as key vehicles of revisionist narrative.

Charge: re-fried Francoist fables

The debate is centred on the Second Republic and to some extent on the Civil War, though occasionally also Restoration period or Francoism might come under scrutiny. A thesis initially advanced by anti-revisionist scholars was that after 1975 "mayoritario sector" of Spanish historiography agreed a propaganda-free opinion on the Republic and that in post-Francoist Spain there was no ideologically-motivated "war of historians"; revisionists were marked as these who tried to open such a war. Recently this position has changed and some anti-revisionists admit that indeed there might be some "areas of contention" and controversies, embodied in a debate between these who denounce "false orthodox canon" and these who denounce "revisionism". However, many authors keep flagging revisionism as a social rather than historiographic phenomenon.

Revisionists are considered to be motivated by a desire to defame the Republic; their key thesis is that the Civil War was caused by the Left. This underlying bottom message is reportedly sustained by a number of more detailed concepts. One critic listed them in an ironic "decalogue of the revisionist": 1) pretend scientific neutrality; 2) disregard "structural history"; 3) try to demythologize the Republic; 4) present the Republic as exclusion; 5) blame the Left for radical revolutionism; 6) deny CEDA’s role of a Fascist Trojan horse; 7) claim that Bienio negro was not so black; 8) underline that violence was equal on both sides; 9) criticize memoria historica as having nothing to do with history; 10) glorify the transition, made possible by Francoism.

Historians called revisionists are typically refused scientific credentials, denied both to relatively young scholars and to academic Hispanists who established their position during decades. Some are presented as interested in selling books rather than in historical rigor. The charge raised most frequently is that instead of establishing the truth their aim is to dismantle "liberal-left myths". Since they are not honest they do not qualify as scientists, even though they very much pretend so and constantly raise claims to a myth of scientific "objectivity" and "impartiality", qualities which they are also denied. The revisionists reportedly lack "modus operandi propiamente historiográfico", fail "to provide a balanced assessment", demonstrate bias, distort history, resort to "pseudo-scientific" methods, manipulation and deliberate falsification, create new myths, tend to be hysterical and cultivate their own "pedagogics of hate". An index of manipulative techniques used by the revisionists contains 5 key methods: 1) use of logical fallacies; 2) relativisation, reductionism and negationism; 3) mystification; 4) psychologization and 5) mythologization.

The revisionist authors are "in the service of the political aims of the present", their goal identified as to "whitewash the history of the Spanish right" and to cover up Nationalist crimes. They are linked to a range of political options and might be dubbed "historiographic Right", "conservatives", "neo-Conservatives", "theo-conservatives", "ultraconservatives", "conservative/neo-Francoist", "pro-Francoists", "filofranquistas", "regime's panegyrists and ideologized 'historians'", "Francoist apologists" and "authoritarians". They are charged with exalting "pure Francoism", sustaining "canon neofranquista", "peddling discredited historical narrative", "repackaging the legends of Francoist ‘historiography’", serving "re-fried Francoist fables", "almost 'Blue'" myths and even nurturing "filonazismo". The charges are supposed proven by political membership of some historians, their publications in right-wing periodicals or publishing houses, links to right-wing institutions, their set of "ideological bedmates" or who they dined with. At times their presence in public discourse is cast against the background of Holocaust denial and revisionism being punishable by law in countries like Germany.

Key conflicting theories

Counter-charge: República no fue Caperucita Roja

Authors referred to as revisionists do not adopt a uniform stand. Some implicitly accept the label since they openly format their works as challenge to alleged "myths", reportedly prevailing in historiography. Some joined the anti-revisionist campaign and turned from iconic revisionists to iconic anti-revisionists. Some ignore the term and do not take part in direct polemics. Some assumed a combative position and in numerous articles, press statements and books they confront their opponents. There are authors dubbed revisionists who deny having anything in common with other "revisionists" and treat them in a derogatory manner, there are authors who admit sharing similar views. In general, they question existence of an orthodox, generally accepted historiographic vision of the Republic and claim that historiography is about debate and plurality of opinions. On this basis they maintain that no such thing as revisionism exists, that the term is artificial construction which bundles together various scholars and opinions, and that by means of similar arbitrary judgments even icons of anti-revisionism like Preston might be counted in. A somewhat sympathetic term alternative to "revisionism" is "Moaist revolution".

There is no name commonly applied to scholars who criticize supposed revisionism, though some coined the term "contrarrevisionismo". They are at times referred to as "pequeño grupo de historiadores" who intend to monopolize the discourse by means of social, political and infrastructural network they had built. To this end, they allegedly attempt to stigmatize all these who do not comply as pseudo-scientists, busy with dirty political agenda and not deserving a place in academic discourse. The anti-revisionist authors are presented as driven by their own prejudice, ideologically motivated, "politically committed" and named "small group of historians determined to defend at all costs the vision of a sacred and ‘heroic’ republican democracy". Their supposed political sympathies are clearly described as Left-wing, with references to "historiografía ‘progresista’", "nueva [progressist] religión civil", "anti-Fascist historiography", "political correctness", "post-Marxist ideology", "militant history" and "anti-Francoist, progressive historians". Their principal objective is described as further mythologization of the Republic; this stand is ironically referred by remarks that "Republic was not a Little Red Riding Hood".

Some revisionist authors take charges of their supposed Francoist sympathies very seriously. They demand from periodicals which published such opinions the right to reply and require individuals advancing such claims to retract them; these demands usually produce no result except claims that by "threatening quasi-legal language" they intend to administratively limit free speech. They also claim to have never endorsed the regime and diagnose that though there might have been a modest post-Francoist revival in some sectors of the Spanish media, all professional historians remained immune. They reverse the charges and maintain that it is rather the "contrarrevisionistas" who demonstrate a Francoist heritage: unable of detaching science from politics, they reportedly view history in Manichean terms, refuse to acknowledge their analysis, and got locked in a schematic bi-polar logic. These revisionists attempt to reverse also other charges directed at them and similarly denounce their opponents in terms who they dine with and where they publish, e.g. by noting that one of the most militant anti-revisionists is related to a Trotskyite periodical. They use anti-intellectualism to attempt to ridicule the pose of moral superiority, reportedly assumed by those lambasting revisionism, and agonize about their alleged "personal smears".

Protagonists

See also

 Second Spanish Republic
 Spanish Civil War
 Francoism
 Spanish transition to democracy
 Historical revisionism
 Historiography

Footnotes

Further reading

 Francisco Espinosa Maestre, El fenómeno revisionista o los fantasmas de la derecha española, Badajoz 2005, 
 Carlos Forcadell, Ignacio Peiró, Mercedes Yusta (eds.), El pasado en construcción. Revisionismos históricos en la historiografía contemporánea, Zaragoza, 2015, 
 Forum, [in:] Journal of Contemporary History 51/2 (2016), pp. 412–438
 Debate, [in:] Journal of Contemporary History 52/1 (2017), pp. 118–163
 Enrique Moradiellos, Revisión histórica crítica y pseudo-revisionismo político presentista: el caso de la Guerra Civil Española, Badajoz 2011
 Alberto Reig Tapia, Anti-Moa, Madrid 2008, 
 Alberto Reig Tapia, La crítica de la crítica: Inconsecuentes, insustanciales, impotentes, prepotentes y equidistantes, Madrid 2017, 
 Alberto Reig Tapia, Revisionismo y política. Pío Moa revisitado, Madrid 2008, 
 Michael Richards, After the Civil War. Making Memory and Re-making Spain since 1936, Cambridge 2013,
 Ángel Viñas (ed.), Sin respeto por la historia [extraordinary issue of Hispania Nova] 2015
 Ángel Viñas (ed.), En el combate por la historia, Madrid 2012, 

Falangism
Historiography of Spain
Neo-fascism